George Glennie (March 30, 1902 – December 11, 1998) was a guard in the National Football League. He played with the Racine Tornadoes during the 1926 NFL season.

References

1902 births
1998 deaths
Racine Tornadoes players
American football offensive guards
Ripon Red Hawks football players